He Chengen (born 7 July 1977) is a Paralympian athlete from China competing mainly in category T36 middle-distance events.

He is from Daletai Village, Lufu Town (鹿阜镇大乐台村) in Shilin Yi Autonomous County, Kunming, Yunnan. At the age of 13 he was infected with encephalitis, which affected his legs, hearing, and language ability. At the 2008 Summer Paralympics in Beijing, China, he won a silver medal in the men's 800 metres - T36 event,  He is married to Gao Xiaohong (高晓红), who lives in Dachangle Village (大昌乐村), also in Lufu Town. The couple's first son was born in 2007.

References

External links
 

1977 births
Living people
Chinese male middle-distance runners
Paralympic athletes of China
Athletes (track and field) at the 2004 Summer Paralympics
Medalists at the 2004 Summer Paralympics
Paralympic bronze medalists for China
Athletes (track and field) at the 2008 Summer Paralympics
Medalists at the 2008 Summer Paralympics
Paralympic silver medalists for China
Sportspeople from Kunming
Runners from Yunnan
Paralympic medalists in athletics (track and field)
21st-century Chinese people